Berry Mills is a small, unincorporated community north-west of Moncton, New Brunswick.  It is located around the main Canadian National Railway line, which was formerly the Intercolonial Railway of Canada line.  Major Intersections include New Brunswick Route 128 and New Brunswick Route 2 as well as Homestead Road and New Brunswick Route 128.  Berry Mills also includes the mostly forest area of Lutesville, New Brunswick.

History

The community was founded by, and named after, Jonathan Berry who established a water powered sawmill on land which he was granted.

Berry Mills once hosted two separate rail lines through the community:

 The Intercolonial Railway of Canada built their line connecting Moncton with Rivière-du-Loup, Québec in 1875 via New Brunswick's east coast.  
 The National Transcontinental Railway connected Moncton with Winnipeg, Manitoba, via central New Brunswick, Northern Québec, and Northern Ontario.  Construction began in 1903 and the line was operational in 1913.

When the Canadian Government nationalized these two railways to form Canadian National Railway, the two lines were connected via junctions east in Moncton and west at Pacific Junction, and the rails were subsequently lifted from the former Intercolonial Railway route.  This became the route of the Berry Mills Road, which is now New Brunswick Route 128.

Places of note

See also
List of communities in New Brunswick

References

 - Jonathan Berry Biography

Communities in Westmorland County, New Brunswick
Communities in Greater Moncton